(stylized as FAKY) is a five-person Japanese girl group that debuted in 2013 under Avex's Rhythm Zone record label. The group has gone through two reformations and currently consists of Lil' Fang, Mikako, Hina, Akina, and Taki. The group name was derived from the word "fake" to challenge themselves to bring something "real" to the Japanese music scene. Their name also stands for "Five Ass Kicking Youngsters" and "FAntastic toKYo". The group defines themselves as a "Next Generation Girls Union" and tends to take musical inspiration from outside of Japan while incorporating Japanese culture and fashion.

History
The group's name and concept was first revealed on a teaser site on July 19, 2013, before the original lineup of members, Anna, Diane, Tina, Mikako, and Lil'Fang, was officially revealed on July 22. Their first music video "Better Without You" was released on July 29, 2013. 

In June 2014, the group announced that they would be on hiatus. Their first album The One was released through iTunes on July 2, 2014.

In October 2015, the group returned from being on hiatus for more than a year. During this time, Akina joined the group while Diane and Tina left. On May 11, 2016, the group then released the second EP Candy.

In 2016, Faky, musical duo FEMM, and singer and songwriter Yup'in formed the supergroup Famm'in and released a self-titled EP.

On June 14, 2017, the group made their major label debut with the third EP Unwrapped.

On November 16, 2018, member Anna announced on Instagram that she would be departing from the group to pursue an acting career. She performed as a member for the last time at Faky's headline tour, fo(u)r,  on December 20. On the same day, Faky announced that they added two new members, Hina and Taki, and would continue as a five-member group.

On November 27, 2020, member Akina made her solo debut with the single "Touch".

Members

Current

Former

Timeline

Discography

EPs

Live albums

Singles

Remix singles

Solo singles

Collaborations

Other appearances

Music videos

As group

As soloist

As featured artist

Filmography

Films

Television series

Web series

Radio series

Video games

Live performances

Concerts

Events

Joint Events

Awards and nominations

References

External links

Japanese girl groups
Japanese pop music groups
Japanese-language singers
Musical groups established in 2013
Musical groups reestablished in 2015
Musical groups reestablished in 2018
2013 establishments in Japan
Avex Group artists